Dasmenda, possibly also known as Dasmendron, was a town of ancient Cappadocia, inhabited through Roman and Byzantine times.

Its site is located near Ovacık, Asiatic Turkey.

References

Populated places in ancient Cappadocia
Former populated places in Turkey
Roman towns and cities in Turkey
Populated places of the Byzantine Empire
History of Niğde Province